A pupa ("doll"; plural: pupae) is the life stage of some insects undergoing transformation between immature and mature stages. Insects that go through a pupal stage are holometabolous: they go through four distinct stages in their life cycle, the stages thereof being egg, larva, pupa, and imago. The processes of entering and completing the pupal stage are controlled by the insect's hormones, especially juvenile hormone, prothoracicotropic hormone, and ecdysone. The act of becoming a pupa is called pupation, and the act of emerging from the pupal case is called eclosion or emergence.

The pupae of different groups of insects have different names such as chrysalis for the pupae of butterflies and tumbler for those of the mosquito family. Pupae may further be enclosed in other structures such as cocoons, nests, or shells.

Position in life cycle
The pupal stage follows the larval stage and precedes adulthood (imago) in insects with complete metamorphosis. The pupa is a non-feeding, usually sessile stage, or highly active as in mosquitoes. It is during the pupal stage that the adult structures of the insect are formed while the larval structures are broken down. The adult structures grow from imaginal discs.

Duration
The pupal stage may last weeks, months, or even years, depending on temperature and the species of insect. For example, the pupal stage lasts eight to fifteen days in monarch butterflies. The pupa may enter dormancy or diapause until the appropriate season to emerge as an adult insect. In temperate climates pupae usually stay dormant during winter, while in the tropics pupae usually do so during the dry season.

Emergence
Insects emerge (eclose) from pupae by splitting the pupal case. Most butterflies emerge in the morning. In mosquitoes, the emergence is in the evening or night. In fleas, the process is triggered by vibrations that indicate the possible presence of a suitable host. Prior to emergence, the adult inside the pupal exoskeleton is termed pharate. Once the pharate adult has eclosed from the pupa, the empty pupal exoskeleton is called an exuvia; in most hymenopterans (ants, bees and wasps) the exuvia is so thin and membranous that it becomes "crumpled" as it is shed.

Pupal mating

In a few taxa of the Lepidoptera, especially Heliconius, pupal mating is an extreme form of reproductive strategy in which the adult male mates with a female pupa about to emerge, or with the newly moulted female; this is accompanied by other actions such as capping of the reproductive system of the female with the sphragis, denying access to other males, or by exuding an anti-aphrodisiac pheromone.

Defense
Pupae are usually immobile and are largely defenseless. To overcome this, pupae often are covered with a cocoon, conceal themselves in the environment, or form underground. There are some species of Lycaenid butterflies which are protected in their pupal stage by ants. Another means of defense by pupae of other species is the capability of making sounds or vibrations to scare potential predators. A few species use chemical defenses including toxic secretions. The pupae of social hymenopterans are protected by adult members of the hive.

Types
Based on the presence or absence of articulated mandibles that are employed in emerging from a cocoon or pupal case, the pupae can be classified in to two types:
 Decticous pupa – a pupa with articulated mandibles. Examples are pupae of the orders Neuroptera, Mecoptera, Trichoptera and few Lepidoptera families.
 Adecticous pupa – a pupa without articulated mandibles. Examples include the orders Strepsiptera, Coleoptera, Hymenoptera, Diptera and Siphonaptera.

Based on whether the pupal appendages are free or attached to the body, the pupae can be classified as one of three types:
 Exarate pupa – appendages are free and are not usually encapsulated within a cocoon. Decticous pupae are always exarate; some adecticous pupae are as well. (Neuroptera, Trichoptera, Cyclorrhapha of Dipterans, Siphonaptera, most Coleoptera, Hymenoptera, and few Lepidoptera).
 Obtect pupa – appendages are attached closely to the body and are commonly encapsulated within a cocoon. Some adecticous pupa are obtect forms. (Most Lepidoptera, Nematocera and Brachycera of Dipterans, Staphylinidae and Chrysomelidae Coleopterans, many Chalcidoidea Hymenopterans)
 Coarctate pupa – enclosed in a hardened cuticle of the penultimate larval instar called a puparium. However, the pupa itself is of the exarate adecticous pupal form. (Cyclorrhapha of Dipterans).

Chrysalis

The term is derived from the metallic–gold coloration found in the pupae of many butterflies, referred to by the Ancient Greek term  for gold.

When the caterpillar is fully grown, it makes a button of silk which it uses to fasten its body to a leaf or a twig. Then the caterpillar's skin comes off for the final time. Under this old skin is a hard skin called a chrysalis.

Because chrysalises are often showy and are formed in the open, they are the most familiar examples of pupae. Most chrysalides are attached to a surface by a Velcro-like arrangement of a silken pad spun by the caterpillar, usually cemented to the underside of a perch, and the cremastral hook or hooks protruding from the rear of the chrysalis or cremaster at the tip of the pupal abdomen by which the caterpillar fixes itself to the pad of silk. (  'suspended')

Like other types of pupae, the chrysalis stage in most butterflies is one in which there is little movement. However, some butterfly pupae are capable of moving the abdominal segments to produce sounds or to scare away potential predators. Within the chrysalis, growth and differentiation occur. The adult butterfly emerges (ecloses) from this and expands its wings by pumping haemolymph into the wing veins. Although this sudden and rapid change from pupa to imago is often called metamorphosis, metamorphosis is really the whole series of changes that an insect undergoes from egg to adult.

When emerging, the butterfly uses a liquid, sometimes called cocoonase, which softens the shell of the chrysalis. Additionally, it uses two sharp claws located on the thick joints at the base of the forewings to help make its way out. Having emerged from the chrysalis, the butterfly will usually sit on the empty shell in order to expand and harden its wings. However, if the chrysalis was near the ground (such as if it fell off from its silk pad), the butterfly would find another vertical surface to rest upon and harden its wings (such as a wall or fence).

Moth pupae are usually dark in color and either formed in underground cells, loose in the soil, or their pupa is contained in a protective silk case called a cocoon. The pupa of some species such as the hornet moth develop sharp ridges around the outside called adminicula that allow the pupa to move from its place of concealment inside a tree trunk when it is time for the adult to emerge.

Pupa, chrysalis, and cocoon are frequently confused, but are quite distinct from each other. The pupa is the stage between the larva and adult stages. The chrysalis generally refers to a butterfly pupa although the term may be misleading as there are some moths whose pupae resembles a chrysalis, e.g.: the plume winged moths of the family Pterophoridae and some geometrid moths. A cocoon is a silk case that the larvae of moths, and sometimes other insects, spin around the pupa.

Cocoon

A cocoon is a casing spun of silk by many moths and caterpillars, and numerous other holometabolous insect larvae as a protective covering for the pupa.

Cocoons may be tough or soft, opaque or translucent, solid or meshlike, of various colors, or composed of multiple layers, depending on the type of insect larva producing it. Many moth caterpillars shed the larval hairs (setae) and incorporate them into the cocoon; if these are urticating hairs then the cocoon is also irritating to the touch. Some larvae attach small twigs, fecal pellets or pieces of vegetation to the outside of their cocoon in an attempt to disguise it from predators. Others spin their cocoon in a concealed location—on the underside of a leaf, in a crevice, down near the base of a tree trunk, suspended from a twig or concealed in the leaf litter.

The silk in the cocoon of the silk moth can be unraveled to harvest silk fibre which makes this moth the most economically important of all lepidopterans. The silk moth is the only completely domesticated lepidopteran and does not exist in the wild.

Insects that pupate in a cocoon must escape from it, and they do this either by the pupa cutting its way out, or by secreting enzymes, sometimes called cocoonase, that soften the cocoon. Some cocoons are constructed with built-in lines of weakness along which they will tear easily from inside, or with exit holes that only allow a one-way passage out; such features facilitate the escape of the adult insect after it emerges from the pupal skin.

Puparium

Some pupae remain inside the exoskeleton of the final larval instar and this last larval "shell" is called a puparium (plural, puparia). Flies of the group Muscomorpha have puparia, as do members of the order Strepsiptera, and the Hemipteran family Aleyrodidae.

Gallery

See also
 Brood (honeybee)
 Larva
 Silk

References

External links

 Pupa photos plus species descriptions at Insecta.pro
 Silk worm life cycle photos

Insect physiology
Insect developmental biology
Articles containing video clips